Karl David Svensson (born 9 April 1984) is a retired Swedish footballer who played as a midfielder.

He represented Falkenbergs FF throughout the whole career as a one-club man and served as the team captain.

References

External links

1984 births
Living people
Association football midfielders
Falkenbergs FF players
Swedish footballers
Allsvenskan players
Superettan players
People from Falkenberg
Sportspeople from Halland County